Biggs High School is a public high school in Biggs, California, United States, a city north of Sacramento and south of Redding.

Enrollment
Biggs High School enrolled about 175 students in the 2010-2011 school year.

The school was very integrated in the school year of 2011-2012, with 2.4% of the student body being American Indian/Alaska Native, 1.2% Asian, 47% Hispanic, and 48.8% White.

Athletics
Biggs High School offers nine sport teams, including baseball/softball, basketball, football, wrestling, volleyball, track, soccer, dance, and cheerleading.

References

External links

Biggs High School website
Biggs Unified School District

High schools in Butte County, California
Public high schools in California